Gwinnett Technical College is a public technical school in the U.S. state of Georgia with campuses in Lawrenceville and Alpharetta.  It is a unit of the Technical College System of Georgia and is accredited by the Southern Association of Colleges and Schools. Since opening its doors as the Gwinnett Area Technical School in 1984, the college has added numerous programs of study, made two name changes, expanded its facilities and experienced enrollment growth. Currently, the Lawrenceville campus is 88 acres and the Alpharetta-North Fulton Campus is 25 acres.

Founding, growth, and name changes 
In 1984, to meet the demand for technological training, the Gwinnett Area Technical School was founded. The school subsequently expanded its offerings to include a wider variety of high-tech programs. In 1988, the name was changed to Gwinnett Technical Institute, aligning Gwinnett Tech with the network of state technical institutes under the Georgia Department of Technical and Adult Education (DTAE).

The following year, DTAE approved Gwinnett Tech to grant associate degrees in applied technology (AAT) in six programming areas, which paved the way for Gwinnett Tech to pursue accreditation with the Southern Association of Colleges and Schools Commission on Colleges.

Gwinnett Technical Institute changed its name on July 6, 2000 to Gwinnett Technical College to better reflect its position within the region's higher education market. The name change was made possible by Georgia's A+ Education Reform Act of 2000, which allowed technical institutes with proper accreditation to be designated as colleges.

History of expansion
During its 28-year history, Gwinnett Technical College has expanded its campus to include a variety of new facilities, including the Health Sciences Building, Corporate Training Center, Environmental Horticulture Center and Computer Training Center. The George Busbee International Center for Workforce Development(Lawrenceville Building 700) opened in spring 2003 and is dedicated to workforce training. The Busbee Center includes a 350-seat auditorium and a technology center with flexible meeting, conference, classroom and exhibit space.

Gwinnett Tech opened the D. Scott Hudgens, Jr. Early Education Center during the summer of 2006. The $7 million facility serves as a  interactive classroom and observation site for students enrolled in the college's Early Childhood Care and Education program and provide the community with early childhood care and pre-school instruction, including two Georgia Pre-K classes.

Today, Gwinnett Tech offers more than 150 associate degree, diploma and certificate programs and hundreds of continuing education seminars and workshops to improve job skills and provide specialized training.

References

External links

Technical College System of Georgia
Universities and colleges accredited by the Southern Association of Colleges and Schools
Educational institutions established in 1984
Education in Gwinnett County, Georgia
Buildings and structures in Gwinnett County, Georgia
1984 establishments in Georgia (U.S. state)